The Anglican Church of St Andrew in Puckington, Somerset, England, was built in the 13th century. It is a Grade II* listed building.

History

The church was built in the 13th century and revised in the 15th. A Victorian restoration in the mid 19th century added the south transept.

The parish is part of the Winsmoor benefice within the Diocese of Bath and Wells.

Architecture

The stone building consists of a two-bay nave, two-bay chancel, transept, and a porch on the southern side with a small vestry on the north. Its three-stage tower is supported by set-back buttresses. It has a tiled roof adorned with gargoyles and battlements with pinnacles. Inside the church is a 13th-century piscina and sedilia.

See also
 List of ecclesiastical parishes in the Diocese of Bath and Wells

References

Grade II* listed buildings in South Somerset
Grade II* listed churches in Somerset
Church of England church buildings in South Somerset
South Somerset
13th-century church buildings in England